Gertrude Crampton (June 26, 1909 – June 25, 1996) was an author of children's books, including Tootle (1945) and Scuffy the Tugboat (1946).

Biography
Gertrude Crampton was born on June 26, 1909, in Brooklyn, New York, to Faust Crampton and Ruby O'Mally Crampton.  She received her teaching credentials from the University of Michigan, Ann Arbor in 1928 and taught in the Mason Consolidated Schools in Erie, Michigan in the 1950s and 1960s.

Her books Tootle and Scuffy were published in the popular Little Golden Books series of Simon & Schuster.  As of 2001, Tootle was the all-time third best-selling hardback children's book in English; Scuffy was eighth. She also wrote The Large and Growly Bear, published in the Golden Beginning Reader series in 1961, and illustrated by John P. Miller.

References

Catalog of Copyright Entries Third Series, 1958: January–June: Library of Congress Copyright Office

1909 births
1996 deaths
American children's writers
Little Golden Books
University of Michigan School of Education alumni
Writers from New York (state)